Till & McCulloch are James Till and Ernest McCulloch who, while studying the effect of radiation on the bone marrow of mice at the Ontario Cancer Institute, in Toronto, demonstrated the existence of multipotent stem cells in 1961.

Collaboration 
Till & McCulloch first published their findings of the discovery of stem cells in the journal Radiation Research. In later work, joined by graduate student Andy Becker, they cemented their stem cell theory and published the results in the journal Nature in 1963.

Till & McCulloch then expanded their research activities and mentored other young scientists, some notable. Scientists that were under the direct supervision of Till or McCulloch were members of their research group, or were co-authors of papers, including the following:

 Louis Siminovitch
 Tak Mak
 Alan Bernstein
 Connie Eaves
 Victor Ling

Both Till & McCulloch continued their research.

Till's focus shifted increasingly towards the evaluation of cancer therapies and quality of life issues in the 1980s. He has positions in organizations including the Stem Cell Network, Project Open Source, Canadian Breast Cancer Foundation, and others. Among them, Till is:
 University Professor Emeritus at the University of Toronto
 Editorial member of the open access journal Journal of Medical Internet Research
 Founding Board member of the Canadian Stem Cell Foundation

McCulloch's later research had an emphasis on cellular and molecular mechanisms affecting the growth of malignant blast stem cells from the blood of patients with acute myeloblastic leukemia. McCulloch died on January 20, 2011, shortly before the 50th anniversary of the publication of the 1961 paper in Radiation Research.

Recognition 
Till & McCulloch have received many awards for their collaborative and ground-breaking research. Together, James Till and Ernest McCulloch were:

 Awarded the Gairdner Award in 1969
 Recognized with the Albert Lasker Award for Basic Medical Research in 2005
 Inducted into the Canadian Medical Hall of Fame in 2004

Their scientific work has also earned them many individual awards including:

 James Till
 1993, awarded Robert L. Noble Prize by the Canadian Cancer Society
 1994, made an Officer of the Order of Canada
 2000, made a Fellow of the Royal Society of London
 2004, inducted into the Canadian Medical Hall of Fame
 2005, awarded the Albert Lasker Award for Basic Medical Research along with Ernest McCulloch
 2006, made a member of the Order of Ontario
 Ernest McCulloch
 1974, made a Fellow of the Royal Society of Canada
 1988, made an Officer of the Order of Canada
 1999, made a Fellow of the Royal Society of London
 2004, inducted into the Canadian Medical Hall of Fame
 2005, awarded the Albert Lasker Award for Basic Medical Research along with Jim Till
 2006, made a member of Order of Ontario

References

External links 
Albert Lasker Basic Medical Research Award
Biography of Dr. Ernest McCulloch on the Canadian Medical Hall of Fame
Biography of Dr. James Edgar Till on the Canadian Medical Hall of Fame
Dr. James Till - Dr. Ernest McCulloch Canadian Medical Hall of Fame Laureate 2004

Bone marrow
1961 in Ontario